Pabna is a city of Pabna District,  Bangladesh and the administrative capital of the eponymous Pabna District.

Etymology
 According to the historian Radharaman Saha, Pabna is named after Paboni, a branch of the Ganges (Originated from Himalayan).
 Archeologist Cunningham wrote that the name came from "Poth", a totem folk who lived long ago in this region (Poundrabardhan). A survey map from 10 depicts a Mouza (medium-size village) named Padeh Pabna in the Nazirpur Pargana (pargana can be considered as a cluster of villages).
 Haraprasad Shastri, the author and historian, regarded the name Pabna as originating from Podubomba, a small feudal kingdom, which was established by a king named Shom, during the Pal Dynasty period.
 Historian Durgadas Lahiri, in his book Prithibir Itihash, used a map from the ancient period where a village named Pabna can be seen.
 A legend: There was a robber (like Robin Hood) named Pobana who lived here long ago. He became a legendary hero for his good deeds. People honoured him by giving his name to the river Pabna.
 The name comes from the Persian word "Panmbah", which means cotton. At one time, a number of inhabitants here were weavers.

Climate

Administration 
Pabna Municipality comprises a mayor and 15 councillors and 5 female councillors. Each councillor represents a ward of the town. All of them are elected by people's vote.

Transport 
Dhaka is about five hours by road, through the Jamuna Bridge. Cities and towns of Dhaka Division, Chittagong Division and Sylhet Division are connected through it. Kushtia District and other parts of Khulna Division and Barisal Division is connected through Lalon Shah Bridge.

River crossing (ferry ghaat) at Nagarbari on the Jamuna River is the old route to Dhaka and the eastern part of Bangladesh. It took three to four hours to cross only the Jamuna from Nagarbari to Aricha river port in Manikgonj District.But Nowadays,The ferry terminal as well as launch terminal shifted from Nagarbari to Kazirhat.It takes approximately 1 hour to cross Jamuna River through ferry from Kazirhat to Aricha Port.There are several ferry and launch services in operation from Kazirhat to Aricha . Najirganj river crossing on the Padma River connects Pabna city with neighbouring Rajbari District as well as Faridpur, Madaripur, Shariatpur and Gopalganj, and Barisal Division.

Pabna is well connected to all the districts and towns of Bangladesh by road.

Pabna city has connected with a new railway network. Pabna Railway Station is in Shalgaria near Pabna Central Bus Terminal, opened on 14 July 2018. A nearby railway station was in Tebunia,  from city center.

The nearby airport is at Ishwardi Upazila. Biman Bangladesh Airlines used to operate twice-weekly services to Ishwardi from Hazrat Shahjalal International Airport, Dhaka. However, no airlines are operating to and from Ishwardi at the moment.

Several Dhaka-bound private bus services are available such as Pabna Express, Shyamoli, Sarkar Travels, Raja Badsha, Badol, Mohanagar, C-line, Arif, Ishurdi Express, Night Star, Kings, Esha, Capital Service, Al-Hamra, Silver Line, etc. Government-owned Bangladesh Road Transport Corporation (BRTC) provides bus services to Rajshahi and Bogra city.

Water transport is important, as the Padma and other rivers, and Chalan Beel wetland are in Pabna. In Pabna district, rides by Nosimon, rickshaw-van, and Korimon are pleasure worthy.

Industry 
Pabna has fledgeling knitted fabric and handloom related textile industries. There are consumer and pharmaceutical producing factories. Square Pharmaceuticals is the largest pharmaceutical company in Bangladesh. A majority of its factories are at Shalgaria near Jubilee Tank area of the town.

Notable industries
Square Pharmaceuticals, Square Road, Shalgaria, Pabna
Square Toiletries, Meril Road, Shalgaria
Square Food and Beverages, Meril Road, Shalgaria
Akij Jute Mills Ltd., Ataikula
Edruc Limited, Arifpur
Shyamoli Foods Ltd, Shalgaria
Bengal Meat
Shamim Flower Mills, Radhanagor
Ms. Gani & Brothers, Kalachandpara
Intra Foods, Balarampur
Ms. Shapla Plastics Ltd., BSCIC I/A
Seven Star Fish Processing Company Ltd., near Central bus terminal, Laskarpur
Universal Foods Ltd., Dilalpur
Apan Store, Hazir hat, Pabna Sadar.
Nuclear Power Plant, Ruppur, Ishwardi, Pabna.

Education 

 Govt. Edward College, Pabna
 Govt. Shaheed Bulbul College
 Government Women's College, Pabna
 Govt. Technical School and College, Pabna
 Imam Ghazzali Girls' School and College
 Pabna College
 Pabna Cadet College
 Pabna Islamia College
 Pabna Medical College
 Pabna Polytechnic Institute
 Pabna University of Science and Technology
 Pabna Zilla School
 Pabna Government Girls' School
 Pabna Central Girls' School. In 2008
 Pabna Islamia Madrasha
 Shaheed M. Munsur Ali College
 Textile engineering college in Pabna.
 Al-Hera Academy school & College, Bera.
 Debuttor Kabi Bande Ali Mia High School
 Galaxy School & College, Bera-Pabna
Masundia Bhawanipur Degree college
Masundia Bhawanipur high school

Health
Pabna has the largest mental hospital in Bangladesh. It also has a big general hospital, numerous medical centres, and small private clinics. Pabna Medical College and Hospital was established in 2008.

In healthcare, Pabna Community Clinic, a division of Dhaka Community Clinic, established and led by Prof. Dr. Quazi Qumruzzaman, has made a great contribution in development and mitigation of arsenicosis. The nine upazilas under Pabna District holds an upazila health complex each. Government doctors get appointment through Bangladesh Civil Service commission.

A 250-bed government-owned general hospital is at Shaalgaariya and a 450-bed mental hospital is at Hemayetpur. Recently the government-owned Pabna Medical College has been set up near the mental hospital, Pabna premise.

Culture
There is a mosque at Chatmohar Upzilla named Shahi Mosque which built by Masum Khan kabuli at 15th century.  
A Mughal-era mosque 'Varara Moshjid' is some 10 km southeast of the town.There is a rumour that the mosque built in one night.

The remains of Hindu temple Jor Bangla (recently renovated) is in Jor Baangla Paara of the town. Jagannath Temple at Chatmohar Upazila is considered one of the most beautiful Hindu temples in northern Bangladesh.

Rassundari Devi, a Bengali writer who is identified as the author of first full-fledged autobiography in modern Bengali literature, was born in Pabna in 1809 or 1810.

Notable residents
 Air Vice Marshal (Rtd.) A. K. Khandker, first Chief of Staff of Bangladesh Air Force (1971–1975), Former Minister, Ministry Planning of People's Republic of Bangladesh
 Mirza Abdul Halim, State Minister, Ministry of Shipping
 Mirza Abdul Awal Founded Chairman Pabna District BNP
Zia Haider, Writer
 Amulya Kumar Saha (1913- ), orthopedic surgeon and past president of Indian Orthopedic Association was born in Pabna
 Amiya Bhushan Majumdar, Indian novelist
 Mohammed Shahabuddin Chuppu, jurist and politician, President-elect of Bangladesh
 Amjad Hossain, MNA (Member of National Assembly of Pakistan), organiser of Liberation War of Bangladesh in 1971.
 Bonde Ali Miah, poet
 Group Captain (Rtd.) Saiful Azam, former pilot, a war hero of 1965 Indo-Pakistani War and 1967 Arab-Israeli War (Six-Day War)
 General Joyanto Nath Chaudhuri OBE, former Chief of Army Staff of the Indian Army.
 Pramatha Chaudhuri, writer
 Samson H. Chowdhury, businessman, former chairman of Square Group
 Thakur Anukulchandra, guru, physician and founder of Satsang Ashram
 Mohammed Fazle Rabbee, cardiologist, intellectual, murdered in the intellectual killing during the 1971 genocide in Bangladesh by Pakistani army and its local collaborators, the Jamaat-affiliate
 A. B. Mirza Azizul Islam
 Pramatha Chaudhuri, Writer
Daud Haider, Poet
Rashid Haider, Writer
 Abu Hena Mustafa kamal

References

External links 
Pabna city website
Dainik Ichhamoti
Onabil Songbad
News Pabna
Pabna Sangbad

Pabna District
Populated places in Pabna District
Pourashavas of Bangladesh